Ketevana Konstantinovna Dzhaparidze (February 11, 1901, Kvishkheti, Kutais Governorate, Russian Empire – September 20, 1968, Tbilisi, Georgian SSR, USSR) was Georgian Soviet singer. People's Artist of the Georgian SSR (1956).

Biography 
She went to study at the Tiflis noble gymnasium in 1909, where her powerful voice was noticed by the famous composer Zachary Paliashvili, who worked there as a music teacher and led the school choir.

In 1919, she entered the Tiflis Conservatory.

In 1927, after graduating from the conservatory, she went to Berlin, where she took singing lessons for 3 years. In 1930, she returned to the USSR (Georgia).

In the spring or summer of 1937, Keto made her debut in Moscow, she gave a solo concert on the stage of the Hermitage (Moscow theater of the revolution). Around the same time (in the spring of 1937), she made her debut in Leningrad at the theater of Recreation garden.

In 1939, she was invited to participate in the First all-Union competition of pop artists and received one of the prizes.

During the World War II, Keto had to change her repertoire and started performing patriotic songs. The singer gave many concerts in hospitals and on the front line.

In 1956, Dzhaparidze was awarded the title of People's Artist of the Georgian SSR.

Keto died on September 20, 1968, and was buried in the Didube Pantheon.

References

Burials at Didube Pantheon
1901 births
1968 deaths
20th-century women singers from Georgia (country)
Soviet women singers
20th-century Russian women singers
20th-century Russian singers